Oorum Uravum is a 1982 Indian Tamil-language film, directed by Major Sundarrajan and produced by Pushpa Rajan. The film stars Sivaji Ganesan, K. R. Vijaya, A. V. M. Rajan and Thengai Srinivasan. The film was a remake of Telugu film Oorukichchina Maata.

Plot 
Shivaji Ganesan, playing the elder brother, works hard as does his village to make his younger brother played by Ravi a doctor to serve the people of the village. Once he becomes a doctor, he falls in love with a rich colleague, gets married to her and settles down in the city with his wealthy father-in-law. How Shivaji Ganesan brings Ravi to his senses is the rest of the story.

Cast 
Sivaji Ganesan
K. R. Vijaya
A. V. M. Rajan
Thengai Srinivasan
Nizhalgal Ravi
Major Sundarrajan

Soundtrack 
Soundtrack was composed by Shankar–Ganesh. Lyrics wrote by Vaali, Pulamaipithan and Vairamuthu. 
"Pullankuzhal" – S. P. Balasubrahmanyam, Vani Jairam
"Orey Vazhthuraikka" – T. M. Soundararajan, P. Susheela
"Kanni Penn" – Malaysia Vasudevan, S. P. Sailaja

References

External links 
 

1980s Tamil-language films
1982 films
Films directed by Major Sundarrajan
Films scored by Shankar–Ganesh
Tamil remakes of Telugu films